Albert Frey may refer to:
Albert Frey (architect) (1903–1998), American architect
Albert Frey (SS officer) (1913–2003), commander 1st SS Panzer Grenadier Regiment
Albert Frey-Wyssling (1900–1988), Swiss botanist